The RD400 is a  two-stroke air cooled six-speed motorcycle produced by Yamaha from 1976 until 1979. It evolved directly from the Yamaha RD350 The 350 evolved into the RD400C in 1976, the "D" and "E" in '77–'78 and the final model, the white 1979 RD400F. (The model year for the first RD400, which was sold in the U.S. in the summer of 1975, was 1976.) The RD series was discontinued due to new emissions rules in the late 70's and eventually all road motorcycles were 4-stroke engines and did not burn oil with the fuel mixture to lubricate the pistons. 

The RD400 came with a unique self-cancelling light system that measured wheel rotations after the indicator lights were enabled. Also, for convenience, the RD did not require pre-mix fuel in the tank since it came with a 2-stroke oil pump which delivered the appropriate amount of oil when the throttle was engaged. 

The brakes were single disc front and rear. It could complete a standing quarter-mile in 14.01 seconds.

The RD400C was the first motorcycle by a major manufacturer to be fitted with cast wheels.

In 1979 the RD was fitted with a capacitor discharge electronic ignition (CDI) unit, as well as thinner spoked cast wheels, a new foot peg position, and some minor engine modifications.

See also
List of Yamaha motorcycles

References

RD400
Motorcycles introduced in 1975
Two-stroke motorcycles
Motorcycles powered by straight-twin engines
Standard motorcycles